"Winter Hill" is the second single from Doves' fourth studio album Kingdom of Rust. The single was released on 20 July 2009 via Heavenly Records. The song is one of three songs recorded during the album sessions produced by John Leckie (the other two being album track "10:03" and B-side "Push Me On"). The radio edit of "Winter Hill" features a new mix by David Bascombe. In a track-by-track discussion with NME, Doves said that the song is about Winter Hill near Bolton, and that the track had been "hanging around since Lost Souls but we've not worked on it before...it just kept knocking on our door." "Winter Hill" was released as a limited edition 7" vinyl single, with the exclusive new "Dylanesque" B-side "Brazil." Three limited edition 12" singles or two separate digital download-only sets feature exclusive remixes of "Jetstream" and "Compulsion" by Sasha, Hans-Peter Lindstrøm, and Andrew Weatherall. "Winter Hill" became the band's first single not to chart in the top 100 of the UK Singles Chart on its week of release. It does not appear on their 2010 best-of album The Places Between, although its video is included on the accompanying DVD.

The music video for "Winter Hill" premiered on 10 June 2009 and features stunt cyclist Danny MacAskill. The video was produced by Pulse Films and directed by David Mould, who previously directed the video for Doves' 2002 single "Caught by the River."

The B-side "Brazil" was remixed by Aeroplane in late 2009.

Track listings

Credits
 "Winter Hill" produced by Doves and John Leckie; mixed by Michael H. Brauer.
 "Winter Hill" (radio mix) mixed by David Bascombe.
 "Brazil" produced by Doves and Dan Austin; mixed by Dan Austin.
 "Jetstream" (Sasha Remix and Subdub) mixed by Sasha.
 "Jetstream" (Lindstrøm Remix) mixed by Hans-Peter Lindstrøm.
 "Jetstream" (The Time & Space Machine Remix) mixed by Richard Norris.
 "Compulsion" (Andrew Weatherall Remix) mixed by Andrew Weatherall.
 Sleeve design by Rick Myers.

Charts

References

2009 singles
Doves (band) songs
Songs written by Jez Williams
Songs written by Jimi Goodwin
Songs written by Andy Williams (Doves)
2009 songs
Song recordings produced by John Leckie
Heavenly Recordings singles
EMI Records singles
Virgin Records singles